Anna Márton (born 31 March 1995) is a Hungarian sabre fencer, Junior European and World Champion in 2014, and a member of the Hungarian National Team. She represented Hungary at the 2016 Summer Olympics held in Rio de Janeiro, Brazil and at the 2020 Summer Olympics held in Tokyo, Japan.

Career

Márton began fencing at the age of nine. She is coached by Gábor Gárdos since she is ten. She won the 2010 Cadet European Championships in Athens and earned a bronze medal at the Cadet World Championships in Baku that same year.

She joined in 2011 the senior national team at the age of sixteen and took part in the World Championships in Catania. She did not get past the qualification phase in the individual event. In the team event, Hungary defeated Canada and South Korea before losing to top-seed Russia, who eventually won the gold medal.

In the 2011–12 season Márton won a double gold medal in the cadet category and an individual gold medal in the junior category at the European Championships in Poreč. She took part in the senior European Championships in Legnano, but lost in the first round to World No.1 Olha Kharlan. The following year, she reached the quarter-finals at the European Championships in Zagreb, ceding to Kharlan again. She was stopped by China's Zhu Min in the table of 32 of the World Championships at home in Budapest.

In the 2013–14 season Márton became Junior European and World champion in Jerusalem and Plovdiv respectively. She also reached the table of 16 in four stages of the Fencing World Cup. She was stopped in the second round by Russia's Yana Egorian at the European Championships in Strasburg, but she got to the table of 16 at the World Championships in Kazan, where she was edged out by Russia's Yekaterina Dyachenko.

Márton studies biology at Eötvös Loránd University.

Awards
 Hungarian Fencer of the Year (4): 2015, 2017, 2019, 2021

References

External links

 
  (archive)
 
 
 

1995 births
Living people
Hungarian female sabre fencers
Martial artists from Budapest
Fencers at the 2016 Summer Olympics
Fencers at the 2020 Summer Olympics
Olympic fencers of Hungary
Universiade medalists in fencing
Universiade gold medalists for Hungary
Universiade silver medalists for Hungary
Medalists at the 2017 Summer Universiade
21st-century Hungarian women